The Gulf Coast of the United States, also known as the Gulf South or the South Coast, is the coastline along the Southern United States where they meet the Gulf of Mexico. The coastal states that have a shoreline on the Gulf of Mexico are Texas, Louisiana, Mississippi, Alabama, and Florida, and these are known as the Gulf States.

The economy of the Gulf Coast area is dominated by industries related to energy, petrochemicals, fishing, aerospace, agriculture, and tourism. The large cities of the region are (from west to east) Brownsville, Corpus Christi, Houston, Galveston, Beaumont, Lake Charles, Lafayette, Baton Rouge, New Orleans,  Gulfport, Biloxi, Mobile, Pensacola, Navarre, St. Petersburg, and Tampa. All are the centers or major cities of their respective metropolitan areas and many of which contain large ports.

Geography

The Gulf Coast is made of many inlets, bays, and lagoons. The coast is intersected by numerous rivers, the largest of which is the Mississippi River. Much of the land along the Gulf Coast is, or was, marshland. Ringing the Gulf Coast is the Gulf Coastal Plain, which reaches from Southern Texas to the western Florida Panhandle, while the western portions of the Gulf Coast are made up of many barrier islands and peninsulas, including the  Padre Island along the Texas coast. These landforms protect numerous bays and inlets providing as a barrier to oncoming waves. The central part of the Gulf Coast, from eastern Texas through Louisiana, consists primarily of marshland. The eastern part of the Gulf Coast, predominantly Florida, is dotted with many bays and inlets.

Climate

The Gulf Coast climate is humid subtropical, although the southwestern tip of Florida, such as Everglades City, features a tropical climate. Much of the year is warm to hot along the Gulf Coast, while the three winter months bring periods of cool (or rarely, cold) weather mixed with mild temperatures. The area is highly vulnerable to hurricanes as well as floods and severe thunderstorms. Much of the Gulf Coast has a summer precipitation maximum, with July or August commonly the wettest month due to the combination of frequent summer thunderstorms produced by relentless heat and humidity, and tropical weather systems (tropical depressions, tropical storms and hurricanes), while winter and early spring rainfall also can be heavy. This pattern is evident in southern cites as Houston, Texas, New Orleans, Louisiana, Mobile, Alabama and Pensacola, Florida. However, the central and southern Florida peninsula and South Texas has a pronounced winter dry season, as at Tampa and Fort Myers, Florida. On the central and southern Texas coast, winter, early spring and mid-summer are markedly drier, and September is the wettest month on average (as at Corpus Christi and Brownsville, Texas). Tornadoes are infrequent at the coast but do occur; however, they occur more frequently in inland portions of Gulf Coast states. Over most of the Gulf Coast from Houston, Texas eastward, extreme rainfall events are a significant threat, commonly from tropical weather systems, which can bring 4 to 10 or more inches of rain in a single day. In August 2017, Hurricane Harvey made landfall along the central Texas coast, then migrated to and stalled over the greater Houston area for several days, producing extreme, unprecedented rainfall totals of over 40 inches (1,000 mm) in many areas, unleashing widespread flooding. Earthquakes are extremely rare to the area, but a surprising 6.0 earthquake in the Gulf of Mexico on September 10, 2006, could be felt from the cities of New Orleans to Tampa.

Rising Sea Levels
Due to the release of greenhouse gas emissions, glaciers and ice sheets are melting and expanding the oceans. This is the largest contributor of rising sea levels along United States coastlines, which are projected to rise 1 foot in three decades or between 10 to 12 inches on average by 2050. The Gulf Coast will likely see the biggest change, with sea levels expected to rise between 14 and 18 inches. The Global and Regional Sea Level Rise Report predicted more frequent, major and destructive high tide flooding events along with taller storm surges by 2050 after scientists determined high tide flooding has been "increasingly common" over the past few years due to the rising sea levels.Higher sea levels mean that deadly and dangerous storm surges, or the rise in seawater level because of a storm, will push farther inland than in the past. The impacts are expected to be dramatic. Low-lying coastal areas are expected to experience: increased levels of flooding, accelerated erosion, loss of wetlands and low-lying terrestrial ecosystems, and seawater intrusion into freshwater sources. Rising sea level and erosion will also imperil critical habitats for many commercially important fisheries that depend on inshore waters for either permanent residence or nursery area. In 2021 alone rising sea levels cost the United States approximately $2.6 billion in relief efforts and caused at least seven deaths. Flood damage is a big contributor to the rising cost. By 2051, the cost of flood damage is expected to increase by 61%, or $32 billion.

https://www.cbsnews.com/news/sea-level-rise-2050-study/
https://coastalscience.noaa.gov/project/predicting-impacts-sea-level-rise-gulf-mexico/ 
https://abcnews.go.com/US/climate-change-rising-sea-levels-increase-cost-flood/story?id=76044769

Economic activities

The Gulf Coast is a major center of economic activity. The marshlands along the Louisiana and Texas coasts provide breeding grounds and nurseries for ocean life that drive the fishing and shrimping industries. The Port of South Louisiana (Metropolitan New Orleans in Laplace) and the Port of Houston are two of the ten busiest ports in the world by cargo volume. As of 2004, seven of the top ten busiest ports in the U.S. are on the Gulf Coast.

The discovery of oil and gas deposits along the coast and offshore, combined with easy access to shipping, have made the Gulf Coast the heart of the U.S. petrochemical industry. The coast contains nearly 4,000 oil platforms.

Besides the above, the region features other important industries including aerospace and biomedical research, as well as older industries such as agriculture and — especially since the development of the Gulf Coast beginning in the 1920s and the increase in wealth throughout the United States — tourism.

History

Before European settlers arrived in the region, the Gulf Coast was home to several pre-Columbian kingdoms which had extensive trade networks with empires such as the Aztecs and the Mississippi Mound Builders. Shark and alligator teeth and shells from the Gulf have been found as far north as Ohio, in the mounds of the Hopewell culture.

The first Europeans to settle the Gulf Coast were primarily the French and the Spanish. The Louisiana Purchase (1803), Adams–Onís Treaty (1819) and the Texas Revolution (1835-1836) made the Gulf Coast a part of the United States during the first half of the 19th century. As the U.S. population continued to expand its frontiers westward, the Gulf Coast was a natural magnet in the South providing access to shipping lanes and both national and international commerce. The development of sugar and cotton production (enabled by slavery) allowed the South to prosper. By the mid 19th century the city of New Orleans, being situated as a key to commerce on the Mississippi River and in the Gulf, had become the largest U.S. city not on the Atlantic seaboard and the fourth largest in the U.S. overall.

Two major events were turning points in the earlier history of the Gulf Coast region. The first was the American Civil War, which caused severe damage to some economic sectors in the South, including the Gulf Coast. The second event was the Galveston Hurricane of 1900. At the end of the 19th century Galveston was, with New Orleans, one of the most developed cities in the region. The city had the third busiest port in the U.S. and its financial district was known as the "Wall Street of the South". The storm mostly destroyed the city, which has never regained its former glory, and set back development in the region.

Since then the Gulf Coast has been hit with numerous other hurricanes.  On August 29, 2005, Hurricane Katrina struck the Gulf Coast as a Category 3 hurricane.  It was the most damaging storm in the history of the United States, causing upwards of $80 billion in damages, and leaving over 1,800 dead. Again in 2008 the Gulf Coast was struck by a catastrophic hurricane. Due to its immense size, Hurricane Ike caused devastation from the Louisiana coastline all the way to the Kenedy County, Texas region near Corpus Christi. In addition, Ike caused flooding and significant damage along the Mississippi coastline and the Florida Panhandle Ike killed 112 people and left upwards of 300 people missing, never to be found. Hurricane Ike was the third most damaging storm in the history of the United States, causing more than $25 billion in damage along the coast, leaving hundreds of thousands of people homeless, and sparking the largest search-and-rescue operation in U.S. history.

Other than the hurricanes, the Gulf Coast has redeveloped dramatically over the course of the 20th century. The gulf coast is highly populated. The petrochemical industry, launched with the major discoveries of oil in Texas and spurred on by further discoveries in the Gulf waters, has been a vehicle for development in the central and western Gulf which has spawned development on a variety of fronts in these regions. Texas in particular has benefited tremendously from this industry over the course of the 20th century and economic diversification has made the state a magnet for population and home to more Fortune 500 companies than any other U.S. state. Florida has grown as well, driven to a great extent by its long established tourism industry but also by its position as a gateway to the Caribbean and Latin America. As of 2006, these two states are the second and fourth most populous states in the nation, respectively (see this article). Other areas of the Gulf Coast have benefited less, though economic development fueled by tourism has greatly increased property values along the coast, and is now a severe danger to the valuable but fragile ecosystems of the Gulf Coast.

Metropolitan areas
The following table lists the 10 largest core-based statistical areas along the Gulf Coast.

Transportation

Road

Major Interstates

Major U.S. routes

Other significant routes

Air

International service

International destinations

Rail

Amtrak service

See also

East Coast of the United States
West Coast of the United States
Emerald Coast
Florida Panhandle
Geography of the United States
Gulf Coast Ecosystem Restoration Task Force
Gulf States Marine Fisheries Commission
Houston
List of ports in the United States
Megaregions of the United States
Mississippi Gulf Coast
New Orleans
Tampa
West Florida
Gulf Coast of Mexico

Notes

Further reading
 Drescher, Christopher F., Stefan E. Schulenberg, and C. Veronica Smith. "The Deepwater Horizon Oil Spill and the Mississippi Gulf Coast: Mental health in the context of a technological disaster." American Journal of Orthopsychiatry 84.2 (2014): 142.
 Smith, F. Todd Louisiana and the Gulf South Frontier, 1500–1821  (Louisiana State University Press; 2014) 304 pages
 Williamson, James M., and John L. Pender. "Economic Stimulus and the Tax Code The Impact of the Gulf Opportunity Zone." Public Finance Review (2014): 1091142114557724.

External links
 "Map of the Gulf Coast from Florida to Mexico" from 1639 via the World Digital Library

 
 Gulf
Coasts of the Atlantic Ocean
Landforms of the Gulf of Mexico
Landforms of Florida
Landforms of Louisiana
Landforms of Mississippi
Landforms of Texas
Megapolitan areas of the United States
Southeastern United States
Southern United States